Eon is an album by American jazz pianist and composer Richard Beirach recorded in 1974 and released on the ECM label.

Reception
The Allmusic review by Chuck Berg awarded the album 2½ stars calling it a "well-programmed set".

Track listing
All compositions by Richard Beirach except as indicated
 "Nardis" (Miles Davis) - 11:56 
 "Places" (Dave Liebman) - 4:04 
 "Seeing You" (Frank Tusa, Richard Beirach) - 4:05 
 "Eon" - 8:13 
 "Bones" - 3:34 
 "Mitsuku" - 6:16 
Recorded at Generation Sound in New York City in November 1974

Personnel
Richard Beirach - piano
Frank Tusa - bass
Jeff Williams - drums

References

ECM Records albums
Richie Beirach albums
1975 albums
Albums produced by Manfred Eicher